Fritz Balogh (16 December 1920 – 14 January 1951) was a German footballer who played as a forward. His first club was DSK Preßburg (Bratislava). In 1941, he joined Hertha BSC as a wartime guest player.

After the Second World War, Balogh played for VfL Neckarau. On 22 November 1950 he participated in his first and only international in the Germany national team, a 1–0 victory against Switzerland. This became the only national-level appearance from a player playing for VfL Neckarau.

Balogh fell from a train when returning from a match against Bayern Munich on 14 January 1951. He succumbed to his injuries a day later.

Selected filmography
 Das große Spiel (1942)

References 

1920 births
1951 deaths
Footballers from Bratislava
German footballers
Association football forwards
Germany international footballers
SC Freiburg players
Hertha BSC players
Railway accident deaths in Germany
Czechoslovak emigrants to Germany